Jerry L. Bryant was an American historian. He was a member of the RPA, or Registered Professional Archaeologists. Bryant worked extensively within the Black Hills of South Dakota and more specifically within the city of Deadwood. His work for the HBO series Deadwood earned him honors from the Academy of Television Arts and Sciences. Bryant was also one of the foremost authorities on the life of Al Swearengen. Bryant was a fierce advocate of historical preservation.

Bryant died January 24, 2015, as a result of health issues.

References

Living people
21st-century American historians
21st-century American male writers
Year of birth missing (living people)
American male non-fiction writers